Miray Balotu (born 8 April 2001) is a Turkish basketball player. The  national plays Power forward.

Career
She was trained in Galatasaray girls' basketball academy. He signed a contract with the A team in the 2017–18 season.

References

External links
 Miray Balotu at Galatasaray.org
 Miray Balotu at Tbf.org
 Miray Balotu at Turkish National Olympic Committee

2001 births
Living people
Galatasaray S.K. (women's basketball) players
Turkish women's basketball players
Basketball players from Istanbul
Power forwards (basketball)